Domilson Cordeiro dos Santos (born 17 November 1998), commonly known as Dodô, is a Brazilian professional footballer who plays as a right-back for Italian  club Fiorentina.

Club career

Coritiba
Born in Taubaté, São Paulo, Dodô started his career at hometown club Taubaté in 2012, as a forward. In 2014, he moved to Coritiba and was promoted to the first team in 2016.

Dodô made his first team debut on 11 March 2016, starting in a 3–0 home win against Avaí, for the year's Primeira Liga competition. He made his Série A debut on 14 May, starting in a 1–0 home win against Cruzeiro.

Dodô established himself as a starter at Coxa, contributing with 26 league appearances during his first season, as his side narrowly avoided relegation; his contract was also renewed until June 2018 in September.

Shakhtar Donetsk
Amidst interest from German club FC Schalke 04 and Portuguese club S.L. Benfica, Dodô joined Ukrainian club Shakhtar Donetsk on 22 November 2017, for a fee of € 2 million. He made his debut abroad on 7 April 2018, coming on as a late substitute for fellow countryman Alan Patrick in a 2–0 away defeat of NK Veres Rivne.

Vitória de Guimarães (loan)
On 29 July 2018, Dodô was loaned to Portuguese club Vitória Guimarães. He made his debut for the club on 6 August, starting in a 2–0 away loss against CD Tondela, for the campaign's Taça da Liga.

Dodô scored his first professional goal on 19 December 2018, netting the game's only in an away success over Boavista FC, for the Taça de Portugal championship.

Fiorentina
On 22 July 2022, Dodô signed with Fiorentina in Italy.

International career
A Brazilian youth international, Dodô played for the under-17 squad in the 2015 FIFA U-17 World Cup, and was a part of the under-20s for 2017 South American Youth Football Championship. He played nine matches in the latter tournament, eight as a starter.

Career statistics

Honours
Coritiba
Campeonato Paranaense: 2017

Shakhtar Donetsk
Ukrainian Premier League: 2017–18
Ukrainian Cup: 2017–18
Ukrainian Super Cup: 2021

References

External links

Profile at the ACF Fiorentina website 

1998 births
Living people
People from Taubaté
Brazilian footballers
Footballers from São Paulo (state)
Association football defenders
Campeonato Brasileiro Série A players
Ukrainian Premier League players
Coritiba Foot Ball Club players
Serie A players
Primeira Liga players
FC Shakhtar Donetsk players
Vitória S.C. players
ACF Fiorentina players
Brazil youth international footballers
Brazil under-20 international footballers
Brazilian expatriate footballers
Brazilian expatriate sportspeople in Ukraine
Expatriate footballers in Ukraine
Brazilian expatriate sportspeople in Portugal
Expatriate footballers in Portugal
Brazilian expatriate sportspeople in Italy
Expatriate footballers in Italy